XHPMQ-FM is a noncommercial radio station on 89.1 FM in Puerto Morelos, Quintana Roo. It is known as 89.1 Frecuencia Mágica.

History
XHPMQ was permitted in December 2012.

References

Radio stations in Quintana Roo